XIII Army Corps (German: XIII. Armeekorps) was a corps of the German Army during World War II. Made up of several divisions, which varied from time to time, it was formed in Nuremberg on 1 October 1937.

Soon after the general mobilisation of August, 1939 the corps was engaged in the Polish campaign. Made up of the 10th, 17th, and 221st Infantry, it was part of the 8th Army. After the decisive German victory at the Battle of the Bzura, the Corps was transferred to the 16th Army in the Trier area of western Germany.

During the Invasion of France the following year the corps advanced to the River Meuse through Luxembourg in May, 1940. Reassigned to the 16th Army in the Champagne district they had reached Chalons-sur-Saône by the time of the Armistice. In July XIII Corps was moved to northern France to take a leading role in the planned, and then abandoned, Operation Sealion, the invasion of England. Instead they were moved to the Netherlands.

In May 1941 they were transferred to East Prussia to take part in Operation Barbarossa, the mass invasion of Soviet Russia. Comprising the 17th and the 78th Infantry Divisions, they formed a unit of the 4th Army in German Army Group Center. By July they had crossed the River Dnieper to Chernigov. In December, faced by Soviet counterattacks, they had to retreat back across the Ugra River. In April 1942 the Corps was transferred to the 4th Panzer Army.

In January 1943 a Soviet counter-offensive pushed XIII Corps back to the Olym river. After the Soviet victory at the Battle of Kursk in July 1943 further retreat back to the River Dneiper was necessary. More Soviet attacks in December forced more retreat. In January 1944 they were pushed back to  Galicia on the border of Poland and Ukraine. In March 1944 the Corps was surrounded and crushed by the Soviet 4th Tank Army near Lviv in western Ukraine and subsequently dismantled by 5 August. Remnants of the Corps were absorbed into the Grossdeutschland Panzer Corps.

In January 1945 a newly formed XIII Corps was created from the Vosges Commando and stationed on the Western Front as part of 2nd Panzer Division. An Allied attack in April pushed the Corps back to Günzburg and, no longer operational, it retreated to the northern Alps.

Commanders
    Cavalry General (General der Kavallerie) Maximilian von Weichs, 12 October 1937 – 26 October 1939
    Colonel-general  (Generaloberst)  Heinrich von Vietinghoff-Scheel, 26 October 1939 – 25 October 1940
    Infantry General (General der Infanterie) Hans-Gustav Felber, 25 October 1940 – 13 January 1942
    Lieutenant-general (Generalleutnant) Otto-Ernst Ottenbacher, 14 Januar – 21 April 1942
    Infantry General (General der Infanterie) Erich Straube, 21 April 1942 – 20 February 1943
    Infantry General (General der Infanterie) Friedrich Siebert, 20 February – 7 September 1943
    Infantry General (General der Infanterie) Arthur Hauffe, 7 September 1943 – 25 April 1944
    Lieutenant-general (Generalleutnant)  Johannes Block, 25 April – 5 June 1944
    Infantry General (General der Infanterie) Arthur Hauffe, 5 June – 22 July 1944
After reformation
    Infantry General (General der Infanterie) Hans-Gustav Felber, 8 January – 11 February 1945
    Lieutenant-general (Generalleutnant) Ralph Graf von Oriola, 12 February – 31 March 1945
    Lieutenant-general (Generalleutnant) Max Bork, 31 March 1945 – 15 April 1945
    Infantry General (General der Infanterie) Walther Hahm, 15 – 20 April 1945
    SS Obergruppenführer Felix Steiner

Area of Operation
 Poland : September 1939 - May 1940 
 France : May 1940 - June 1941 
Eastern Front southern sector : June 1941 - July 1944
Western Front : January 1945 - April 1945

References
 Article based on a translation of the equivalent articles on German and French Wikipedia.
Georg Tessin: Verbände und Truppen der deutschen Wehrmacht und Waffen-SS im Zweiten Weltkrieg 1939–1945, Volume 3, Frankfurt/Main und Osnabrück 1966, S. 260–261.
Percy Ernst Schramm (Hrsg.): Kriegstagebuch des Oberkommandos der Wehrmacht, Bernard & Graefe Verlag für Wehrwesen, Frankfurt am Main 1965.
        Volume I: 1940/41 written by Hans-Adolf Jacobsen.
        Volume II: 1942 written by Andreas Hillgruber, Bernard & Graefe Verlag für Wehrwesen, Frankfurt am Main 1965.
        Volume III: 1943 written by Walther Hubatsch, Bernard & Graefe Verlag für Wehrwesen, Frankfurt am Main 1965.
   Manfried Rauchensteiner: Der Krieg in Österreich 1945, Österreichischer Bundesverlag, Vienna 1985.

Army,13
Military units and formations established in 1937
1937 establishments in Germany
Military units and formations disestablished in 1944
Military units and formations established in 1945
Military units and formations disestablished in 1945